Harry Newman may refer to:
 Harry Newman (American football) (1909–2000), American football quarterback
 Harry Newman (rugby league) (born 2000), English rugby league footballer
 Harry Newman (politician) (1839–1904), Australian politician
 Harry Neumann (1891–1971), sometimes Newman, Hollywood cinematographer

See also
 Henry Newman (disambiguation)